Blues Etude is a 1966 album by Oscar Peterson. It was the trio's last recording to feature bassist Ray Brown.

Track listing 
 "Blues Etude" (Oscar Peterson) – 3:53
 "Shelley's World" (Bill Traut) – 5:20
 "Let's Fall in Love" (Harold Arlen, Ted Koehler) – 3:49
 "The Shadow of Your Smile" (Johnny Mandel, Paul Francis Webster) – 4:39
 "If I Were a Bell" (Frank Loesser) – 5:19
 "Stella by Starlight" (Ned Washington, Victor Young) – 5:17
 "Bossa Beguine" (Peterson) – 3:49
 "L' Impossible" (Peterson) – 5:00
 "I Know You Oh So Well" (Peterson) – 5:05

Personnel 
 Oscar Peterson – piano
 Ray Brown – double bass (tracks 5–9)
 Sam Jones – double bass (tracks 1–4)
 Louis Hayes – drums

References 

1966 albums
Oscar Peterson albums
Limelight Records albums